A number of vessels of the People's Liberation Army Navy have borne the name Nanning, after the city Nanning.

 , a Type 051 destroyer, in service in 1973. Now used as surveillance ship.
 , a Type 052D destroyer, in service since 2021.

References 

People's Liberation Army Navy ship names